Ethmia turnerorum is a moth in the family Depressariidae. The habitat consists of dry forests and rain forests.

The ground color of the forewings is whitish with blackish markings and two distinct spots at the base. There is an oblique irregular dark blotch from before the middle below the costa connecting with an elongated dark mark from the middle to the termen. The hindwing ground colour is whitish, but darker at the margins.

The larvae feed on Cordia panamensis.

Etymology
The species is named in honor of J. D. and Nancy Turner for funding the BioLep building in the Área de Conservación Guanacaste Administration Área in Sector Santa Rosa.

References

Moths described in 2014
[[Category:Ethmia|turnerorum]